The Microsoft Surface touchscreen Windows computers and interactive whiteboards designed and developed by Microsoft. Since its release in 2012, there have been various Surface accessories over the years. Most prominently, are the Surface keyboard covers and the Surface Pen, which were both introduced at launch. While the keyboard covers have all been sold independently of the Surface devices, the initial release of the Surface and Surface Pro had bundle options, which bundled the black Touch Cover. The Surface Pen has been included with all Surface line and Surface Pro line devices up until the release of the fifth-generation Surface Pro, where Microsoft decided to unbundle the Surface Pen.

Accessories

Surface Touch Cover 

The original touch cover came with 80 touch sensors and was pressure sensitive. With the release of the Surface 2 a Touch Cover 2 was announced which increased the number of sensors to 1,092 and added backlit keys while being thinner than the original Touch Cover. In addition, the Touch Cover 2 also supported key gestures and was backwards compatible with the first generation Surface devices. Microsoft never made another Touch Cover after the release of the Surface Pro 3.

It is compatible with the Surface 2.

Type Cover 

With the release of the first generation Surface Pro, Microsoft launched the Type Cover which has tactile keys. It was upgraded along with the second generation Surfaces to the Type Cover 2 which substituted the plastic material for the felt-like material found on the Type Covers. The Type Cover 2 is thinner and features back-lit keys. With the release of the Surface Pro 3, a newer cover called the Surface Pro 3 Type Cover was released to fit the bigger screen. The Surface Pro 3 Type Cover features a second magnetized strip that can be rested against the screen to prop the keyboard up at an angle. The Surface Pro 3 Type Cover has a touchpad with glass beads replacing the felt-like material used in previous generations. When the Surface 3 was announced, a smaller version, the Surface 3 Type Cover was released. Both Surface 3 and Pro 3 Type Covers have a loop to house the Surface Pen.

On October 6, 2015, Microsoft updated the Surface Pro Type Cover with a new teal color in addition to the existing black, red, blue, and bright blue colors. Also introduced was a function lock light, separated keys, and a 40% larger touchpad than previous models. A "Fingerprint ID" version was also announced but is only available in the color black. Both are backwards compatible with the Surface Pro 3, though both are designed for the Surface Pro 4. A Signature Type Cover designed out of grey Alcantara was announced on April 12, 2016.

With the launch of the fifth-generation Surface Pro, Microsoft expanded the Surface Pro Signature Type Cover line to include burgundy, cobalt blue, and platinum with a release date of June 15, 2017.
|Surface Pro 3Surface Pro 4Surface Pro (5th generation)Surface Pro 6

Power Cover 
A Power Cover, introduced alongside the Surface Pro 2, is a non back-lit Type Cover with a built-in battery to extend the Surface's battery life. It is compatible with the Surface Pro and later, due to the additional pins required on the Surface spine. A Wireless Adapter for the keyboards, called the Wireless Adapter for Typing Covers, was also manufactured so that the keyboards can be used at a distance. It was introduced on September, 2013 and has been discontinued on March 26, 2014.

Surface Keyboard 

In 2018, Microsoft launched the Surface Keyboard alongside the Surface Mouse, which is compatible with any Bluetooth enabled device

Surface Mouse 

Two mice have also been released for the Surface including the Wedge Touch and Arc Touch mice. On July 10, 2018, Microsoft launched the Surface Mouse alongside the Surface Keyboard. It is compatible with any Bluetooth-enabled device.

Surface Pen 

Most Surface tablets have an active pen that allows users to write directly onto the screen of the tablet. The Surface Pen for the Surface Pro and Surface Pro 2 use Wacom technology, while its successor released alongside the Surface Pro 3 and newer devices use that of N-trig, which has since been acquired by Microsoft. The Surface Pen was specifically designed to minimize latency (lag time), eliminate parallax issues, which occur when the point where the tip touches the screen does not match up with the spot where the ink actually appears on the device, and provide a more natural-feeling 'pen-on-paper' user experience. The Surface also features palm rejection which allows the user to rest his or her palm on the screen while using the Surface Pen without triggering an unwanted input.
It is compatible with any Bluetooth-enabled device.

Surface Dock 

There are various Docking Stations for different Surface Laptop devices, which are optional non-included accessories. They each extend the Surface with a number of USB ports, additional audio sockets, a Gigabit Ethernet port and a Mini DisplayPort to connect external displays.

Surface Pro 4

With the announcement of the Surface Pro 4 and Surface Book, Microsoft revealed a new Surface Dock accessory in the brick form factor which is compatible with the aforementioned devices and the Surface Pro 3. This new docking accessory connects to the proprietary 40-pin side port which got the new nameSurface Connect.

A Microsoft Garage incubator team designed ergonomic VESA-mounted portrait docking stations as part of the Company hackathon, released a YouTube demo video, open-source plans on GitHub, and made ready-to-use kits available on a web store.

USB-C Adapter
In addition to the Surface Dock, Microsoft has released a USB-C adapter that allows the Surface Pro and Surface Laptop to use generic USB-C docking stations. The adapter supports USB 3, Display Port alternate mode, and charging via USB Power Delivery. Charging requires USB power sources that output 12V, 15V, or 20V. Most cell phone and tablet chargers do not support these voltage levels and cannot charge Surface devices using this adapter.

Surface Dial 

With the introduction of the Surface Studio on 26 October 2016, Microsoft announced a new type of computing device called the Surface Dial. The promoted Surface Dial's purpose is to be used to control functions that artists might find useful, such as pen color or thickness. The Surface Dial is set with standard commands that can be used without being program or app specific. These commands include toggling sound volume, scrolling, zooming, brightness, and undo/redo. However, an app developer can customize the wheel's abilities, when developing apps. Some third-party applications that were included in the Surface Dial launch include Drawboard PDF, Sketchable, StaffPad and Mental Canvas Player. The Surface Dial works on the screen of the Surface Studio, Surface Book 2 and Surface Pro 2017 and off-screen with other Windows 10 devices (that support Bluetooth 4.0 LE) as well including the Surface Book and Surface Pro 4. Microsoft's Terry Myerson told Engadget that a firmware update will be released in early-2017 for the Surface Book and Surface Pro 4 that will allow the on-screen functions to work with those devices.

Surface Dial, like the Surface Pen, utilize non-rechargeable batteries, though the Dial requires the two included AAA alkaline batteries, and the Surface Pen requires a single AAAA battery. Surface Dial requires the Windows 10 "Anniversary Update" in order to function. 

The Dial is compatible with the Surface Pro 4, Surface Studio, Surface Pro (2017), and Surface Book 2.

Surface Headphones 

On October 2, 2018, Microsoft unveiled Bluetooth-compatible Surface Headphones alongside the Surface Pro 6, Surface Laptop 2 and Surface Studio 2. The noise-cancelling Bluetooth headphones feature Cortana integration and four beam-forming microphones.

On August 15, 2020, Microsoft introduced Surface Headphones 2, compatible with Windows 10 and Windows 11 Home/Pro with the latest updates. It's also compatible with Bluetooth 4.1/4.2/5.0, IOS 12 or 13, Android 9 or 10.

Surface Earbuds 
Microsoft released wireless earbuds in 2019 that feature a "dish-looking apparatus" on the outside for touch interactions. The earbuds can also live transcribe a PowerPoint presentation from a connected computer. Like the aforementioned headphones, these are compatible to Bluetooth.

Other accessories 
There are many other accessories for the Microsoft Surface.

Among these is the Microsoft Wireless Display Adapter for Miracast display mirroring. Microsoft launched a Surface HD Digital A/V Adapter which works with micro-HDMI to HDMI for the Surface and Surface 2, and a Surface VGA adapter which also works with Surface and Surface 2 going from the built-in micro-HDMI to VGA.

For the Surface Pro series, a Display Port to HD A/V (HDMI) and a Display Port to VGA adapter was created. For the first generation Surface, a 32 watt power supply was included, which was upgraded with the Surface 2 to feature a larger indicator light to show the Surface was charging. The Surface Pro and Pro 2 feature a 48 watt power supply with a USB (power only) port on the charging brick. As with the Surface 2's power supply, the Pro 2's power supply features a larger indicator light. Microsoft redesigned the power supply for the Surface Pro 3 with a new "fin" connector and a 36 watt rating.

The Surface 3 launched with another redesigned power supply using a micro-USB connector and having a 13 watt rating.

Two Ethernet adapters have been released to work with the Surface Pro line including the Ethernet Adapter for USB 2.0 with a speed rating of 100 Mbit/s and a Surface Ethernet Adapter for USB 3.0 with a speed of 1 Gbit/s.

References

External links
 
 

Microsoft Surface
Surface accessories
Microsoft